Froom may refer to:
People
 Le Roy Froom (1890–1974), Seventh-day Adventist minister and historian
 Mitchell Froom (1953– ), musician and record producer
 Charlotte Froom (1986– ), guitarist of The Like

Other
River Froom, a river in Bristol, England, now generally spelt Frome

See also
 Frome, a town in Somerset, England
Frome (disambiguation)
 Froome (disambiguation)